The Netherlands was represented by Xandra, with the song "Colorado", at the 1979 Eurovision Song Contest, which took place on 31 March in Jerusalem. The song was the winner of the Dutch national final for the contest, held on 7 February. Although it was claimed at the time that Xandra was the name of a six-piece band, in reality it was merely a name adopted by Eurovision veteran Sandra Reemer, who had previously represented the Netherlands in 1972 and 1976. The cover sleeves on the various domestic and international record issues of "Colorado" for example all pictured Reemer on her own without any "band members".

Before Eurovision

Nationaal Songfestival 1979 
The final was held at the RAI Congrescentrum in Amsterdam, hosted by Martine Bijl. Five songs took part, all performed by Xandra, with the winner being decided by eleven juries who each had 50 points to distribute between the songs. Ten of the juries consisted of people from various professions (politicians, musical conductors, carnival workers, nurses, chefs, local mayors, media presenters, actors, footballers and firefighters) while the eleventh was made up of members of the Sandra Reemer fan club.

At Eurovision 
On the night of the final Xandra performed 14th in the running order, following Luxembourg and preceding Sweden. At the close of voting, "Colorado" had received 51 points from 10 countries, placing the Netherlands 12th of the 19 entries. The Dutch jury awarded its 12 points to France.

The Dutch conductor at the contest was Harry van Hoof.

Voting

References

External links 
 Dutch Preselection 1979

1979
Countries in the Eurovision Song Contest 1979
Eurovision